"Smokin' Johnny Cash" is a single by The Blackeyed Susans, released in May 1997.  It was the first single lifted from the band's album, Spin the Bottle.

The song reached #86 on Triple J's Hottest 100 in 1997 and was featured in the Australian television drama series The Secret Life of Us (Episode 3 Second Series).

The video for the song was also aired on the national Australian music video program, rage, in July 2002.

Track listing 
 Smokin' Johnny Cash (Kakulas/Snarski/Dawson) – 3:40
 You Rule Me (Snarski/Kakulas) – 4:15
 Out of Our Skins (Kakulas/Jennings) – 2:50
 Take Me Down (Kakulas/Snarski) – 5:18

Personnel

Track 1-2 
 Rob Snarski – vocals, guitars, whistling
 Phil Kakulas – bass, omnichord
 Kiernan Box – piano, organ, harmonium, string arrangement
 Dan Luscombe – guitars, optigan, vocals
 Mark Dawson – drums, percussion
 Jen Anderson – violin
 Suzanne Simpson -violin
 Deirdre Dowling – viola
 Helen Mountfort – cello
 Matthew Habben – saxophone
 Ken Gardner – trumpet
 Adam Hutterer – trombone
 Mark C Halstead – backing vocals
 Graham Lee – backing vocals
 Lisa Miller – backing vocals
 Jodie Meehan – backing vocals
 Kelly Nash – backing vocals

Track 3 
 Phil Kakulas
 Gary Jennings

Track 4 
 Phil Kakulas
 Rob Snarski
 Graham Lee
 Mark C Halstead

Other credits 
 Produced by Victor van Vugt and Phil Kakulas. Recorded by and mixed by Victor Van Vugt.
 Produced by Victor van Vugt and Phil Kakulas. Recorded by and mixed by Victor Van Vugt.
 Recorded by Phil Kakulas in a bedroom in Nedlands, Perth, long ago. Played by P.K. and Gary Jennings.
 Recorded by Phil Kakulas on an 8-track in a spare room in Abbotsford, Melbourne 1992. Mixed by PK & Julian Wu.

References 

The Blackeyed Susans songs
1997 singles
1997 songs